Ellen Rosalie Simon (April 15, 1916November 19, 2011) was a Canadian stained-glass artist, illustrator and printmaker.

Biography
Ellen Simon was born in Toronto and studied art at the Ontario College of Art, Toronto with Yvonne McKague Housser, among others; the Art Students League of New York (1936-1940); and the New School for Social Research in Toronto. She studied stained-glass by apprenticing with Yvonne Williams in Toronto and with the Joep Nicolas Studio in the Netherlands. 

She was a modern artist who sought to convey political and social issues through her graphics and book or magazine illustrations. In 1937, she made lithographs such as Men (National Gallery of Canada), reproduced in the New Frontier magazine, a monthly Toronto magazine of literature and social criticism (1936-1937) begun in the Depression.

Her major work was as a creator of stained-glass windows for churches, synagogues and universities. For almost 40 years she was a colleague of Yvonne Williams and worked in her Toronto studio at commissions in Canada and the U.S.A. Among the churches for which she created the stained glass along with Yvonne Williams and Rosemary Kilbourne is St. Michael & All Angels Church in Toronto. Her graphics are in the collection of the Art Gallery of Ontario and the National Gallery of Canada.  Ellen Simon died on November 19, 2011 in Amesbury, Massachusetts.

Ellen Simon taught at Riverside Church, New York from 1965 on.

References

External links

Bibliography 

Canadian women artists
Artists from Toronto
1916 births
2011 deaths
20th-century Canadian artists
20th-century Canadian women artists
Canadian glass artists